Mary Fernández is an American computer scientist and activist for women and minorities in science, technology, engineering, and mathematics (STEM). She is the president of MentorNet, an organization that helps mentors and students develop mentoring relationships.

Education 
Fernández enrolled in the engineering department at Brown University in the early 1980s. After taking an introductory computer science course taught by Andries van Dam, she changed her major to computer science. She earned her bachelor's and master's degrees from Brown, and her Ph.D. from Princeton University.

Career 
Fernández joined AT&T as a senior technical staff member in 1995. She worked there for seventeen years, ending her career as the Assistant Vice President of Information and Software Systems Research. During her time there, she worked on technology to handle semi-structured XML, particularly the XQuery language.

In 1998, Fernández joined MentorNet, an organization that matches mentors with STEM students and helps them develop mentoring relationships. She joined the board of directors of the organization in 2009, becoming the board chair in 2011. In 2013 she became CEO, and she transitioned to president in 2014 when MentorNet became a division of the Great Minds in STEM non-profit.

Fernández served as the secretary and treasurer of ACM SIGMOD, and was the associate editor of ACM Transactions on Database Systems. She serves on the board of the Computing Research Association. In 2011, Fernández was awarded the Great Minds in STEM Technical Achievement in Industry Award.

References 

American women computer scientists
American computer scientists
Brown University alumni
Princeton University alumni
AT&T people
Scientists from New York (state)
Place of birth missing (living people)
Year of birth missing (living people)
Living people
20th-century American scientists
21st-century American scientists
20th-century American women scientists
21st-century American women scientists